Seenu Ramasamy is an Indian filmmaker, screenwriter and poet who predominantly works in Tamil cinema. Born on October 13, 1973 near Madurai, Tamilnadu, he is known for directing quality films like Thenmerku Paruvakaatru (2010), Neerparavai (2012), and Dharma Durai (2016)., Kanne Kalaimaane (2019) and Maamanithan (film) (2022).

Career 
He made his directorial debut with Koodal Nagar (2007). He garnered acclaim for the film Thenmerku Paruvakaatru, which went on to win the National Film Award for Best Feature Film in Tamil. A critic noted that "A well-crafted screenplay, clearly defined characters, a smooth, realistic flow of scenes, and fine performances from its entire cast, makes 'Thenmerku Paruvakaatru' one of the more watchable films of recent times". His next film Neerparavai (2012) also released to positive reviews with a critic stating that "Neer Paravai is a beautiful record of the lives of a community, their hopes and dreams, and the harsh reality of their lives. Go and see it". Ramasamy's next film Idam Porul Yaeval got stuck in production. His next film Dharma Durai (2016) received polarized reviews from critics, but was a box-office success. His subsequent film Kanne Kalaimaane (2019) released to mixed reviews with a critic stating that "Though Kanne Kalaimaane tries to be an ambitious film, despite much potential for drama, it lacks a strong script that most Seenu Ramasamy films have".

Books 
Seenu Ramasamy has written “Kaatral Nadanthen”.

Filmography

References

Living people
Place of birth missing (living people)
Tamil film directors
Year of birth missing (living people)
21st-century Indian film directors
Male actors in Tamil cinema
21st-century Indian male actors